The Folk of the Air is a novel by Peter S. Beagle published in 1986.

Plot summary
The Folk of the Air is a novel in which 1980s Californian medievalists go into the past.

Reception
Dave Langford reviewed The Folk of the Air for White Dwarf #96, and stated that "Perhaps I'm disappointed that a writer as gifted as Beagle should only touch the surface of his medievalists, indulging a few ironies [...] but avoiding the depths of motivation which he's well fitted to plumb."

Reviews
Review by Faren Miller (1986) in Locus, #310 November 1986
Review by Charles de Lint (1987) in Fantasy Review, April 1987
Review by Baird Searles (1987) in Isaac Asimov's Science Fiction Magazine, June 1987
Review by Darrell Schweitzer (1987) in Aboriginal Science Fiction, September-October 1987
Review by Tom Easton (1987) in Analog Science Fiction/Science Fact, October 1987
Review by Maureen Porter (1987) in Vector 141
Review by David L. Transue (1987) in Thrust, #28, Fall 1987
Review by M. John Harrison (1987) in Foundation, #38 Winter 1986/87
Review by Orson Scott Card (1988) in The Magazine of Fantasy & Science Fiction, January 1988
Review by Phyllis McDonald (1988) in Interzone, #23 Spring 1988

References

1986 novels